Archimandrite Monsignor Victor J. Pospishil (1915 – 2006) was a Ukrainian Catholic priest  and a leading scholar on Canon law and the Eastern Catholic churches.

During the 1960s he was a controversial advocate for divorced Catholics, arguing in his 1967 book Divorce and Remarriage: Towards a New Catholic Teaching in favor of the reform of the laws that prevented them from receiving the sacraments.

He was born 4 February 1915 in Vienna, Austria, then capital of Austria-Hungary. Following his training at the Theological Academy and Seminary in Đakovo, Croatia, he was ordained a priest on 16 June 1940. During World War II he served as an army chaplain and in parishes in Yugoslavia and Austria.  Afterwards he studied liturgy and canon law at the Pontifical Oriental Institute in Rome, receiving his doctorate from the Pontifical Gregorian University.

He immigrated to the United States in May 1950 where he joined the Ukrainian Greek Catholic Archdiocese in Philadelphia. He served in parishes in Maryland, New Jersey, New York, and Pennsylvania. In recognition of his work in canon law Pope John XXIII gave him the title of Private Papal Chamberlain in 1960. In 1976 was named an Archimandrite by Cardinal Josyf Slipyj. From 1966 to 1976 he served on the religious studies faculty of Manhattan College.

He died 16 February 2006 in Old Bridge, New Jersey and is buried in St. Gertrude Cemetery in Colonia, New Jersey.

Books
 Die Rechtsstellung des Patriarchen der Serbischen Kirche in der Kirchenverfassung von 1931-1947, (Brixen im Thale, Austria: privately published, 1950)
 Interritual Canon Law Problems in the United States and Canada, (Chesapeake City, Maryland: St. Basil's, 1955)
 Code of Oriental Canon Law, the Law on Persons: Rites, Persons in General, Clergy and Hierarchy, Monks, Religious, Laity, (Ford City, Pennsylvania: St. Mary's Ukrainian Catholic Church, 1960)
 Code of Oriental Canon Law, the Law on Marriage: Interritual Marriage Law Problems, (Chicago, Illinois: Universe Editions, 1962)
 Ford City, Pennsylvania 1887-1962: The First Seventy-Five Years of Our Town, editor, (Ford City, Pennsylvania: The Ford City Public Library, 1962)
 Orientalium Ecclesiarum: The Decree on the Eastern Catholic Churches of the II Council of the Vatican, (Bronx, New York: Fordham University, 1965)
 Divorce and Remarriage: Towards a New Catholic Teaching, (New York, New York: Herder and Herder, 1967)
 The Quest for the Ukrainian Catholic Patriarchate, co-author with Hryhor M. Luznycky, (Philadelphia, Pennsylvania: Ukrainian Publications, 1971)
 Ex Occidente Lex, (Carteret, New Jersey: St. Mary's Religious Action Fund, 1979)
 The New Latin Code of Canon Law and Eastern Catholics, co-author with John D. Faris, (Brooklyn, New York: Diocese of St. Maron, 1984)
 Eastern Catholic Church Law, (Brooklyn, New York: Saint Maron Publications, 1996)
 Final Tally: A Report on the Unremarkable Life of a Catholic Priest in the Twentieth Century, (New Jersey: privately published, 2001)

Members of the Ukrainian Greek Catholic Church
Austrian Eastern Catholics
American Eastern Catholics
People from Ford City, Pennsylvania
Clergy from Vienna
Yugoslav emigrants to the United States
1915 births
2006 deaths
Ukrainian military chaplains
Pontifical Oriental Institute alumni
Pontifical Gregorian University alumni
Manhattan College faculty